Andy Hill (born 1951) is an American music supervisor, record producer, and music educator. Under the name A.W. Hill, Hill has written three novels, Nowhere-Land, The Last Days of Madame Rey, and Enoch's Portal, and a screenplay based on the life of Nikola Tesla.

Biography
Andy Hill was born in Chicago, Illinois, United States, and educated at New York University's Tisch School of the Arts. From 1987 to 1996, during the period now referred to as the Disney Renaissance, he served as vice-president of music production for The Walt Disney Studios (division), overseeing music production on a roster of films which included The Lion King, Beauty and the Beast, and Sister Act, and working closely with composers and songwriters such as Alan Menken and Hans Zimmer. Films for which Hill supervised music under the aegis of the Disney music department and its music chief, Chris Montan, earned nine Academy Awards in the categories of Best Original Score and Best Original Song for a Motion Picture. Subsequent to his term at Disney, Hill opened Andy Hill Film + Music under the auspices of Modern Music and supervised projects which included Message In A Bottle, Ed Wood, James and the Giant Peach and Happy Feet, winning a Grammy Award in 2000 as producer of the Best Musical Album for Children for Elmo In Grouchland.

From 2006 to 2011, Hill directed the graduate program in Music Composition for the Screen at Columbia College Chicago. His students have earned music credits on films such as Life of Pi, How To Train Your Dragon, and Perfume: The Story of a Murderer and found work with such notable composers as John Powell, Mychael Danna, Jeff Danna, Johnny Klimek, and Javier Navarrete. In the fall of 2011, Hill was engaged to prepare and oversee the launch of graduate composition programs at Berklee Valencia, the international extension of the Berklee College of Music, including film scoring and electronic music production, with classes commencing in September 2012. The campus is located in the Palau de les Arts, part of the Ciutat de les Arts i les Ciencies designed by visionary architect Santiago Calatrava in Valencia, Spain. Following matriculation of the first class of Berklee degree candidates and a pilot semester, he spent an additional six months in Spain and Morocco working on a portfolio of songs with an enigmatic producer known only as The Old Guitarist. In September 2013, Hill relocated to Belgium to take a post as executive soundtrack producer and director of international business development for Galaxy Studios and the Scoring Flanders initiative, with the goal of bringing more high-level film scoring to the Flanders region and the musical stewardship of the Brussels Philharmonic. Concurrently, he launched Cinemuse VOF as a company under Belgian law, for music supervision and scoring services within the EU. In late 2015, Cinemuse, and Hill, relocated to Nashville, Tennessee, where his principal activities were teaching, lecturing, and mentoring aspiring film composers through his Cinemuse Composer Coaching service. In 2019, he relocated to Sofia, Bulgaria, where he currently serves as dean of the Film Scoring Academy of Europe, a constituent college of the Irish American University in Dublin, and as director of its M.F.A. program in Music for Motion Pictures & Contemporary Media.

Hill was from 2015 to 2018 a visiting lecturer and industry advisor to the Masters Program in Scoring for Film and Visual Media at Pulse College Dublin, a division of Windmill Lane Studios, and a member of the advisory board for Pingtrax (Musimap), a Belgian music search engine utilized by scholars, archivists, media producers and music supervisors. His comprehensive study of landmark film scores, Scoring the Screen: The Secret Language of Film Music, was published in August 2017 by the Hal Leonard Corporation. About the book, Conrad Pope, celebrated orchestrator for John Williams, Alexandre Desplat, and Howard Shore, among others said, "If you have any interest in what music means in film, you must read this book." The book has been selected as a core text by Leeds College and other institutions. In 2020, Hill received his PhD in Film Musicology from the University of South Wales. His dissertation was entitled BARDS OF THE SILVER SCREEN: Music and Meaning In Cinema.

A.W. Hill
Hill is also an American writer of speculative fiction and mystery. He grew up in the Midwest but began writing under the influence of Southern California and has been linked by novelist/ essayist Alan Rifkin to the tradition of "California fabulist literature." Hill has published three literary thrillers featuring Los Angeles cult investigator Stephan Raszer (Stee-vun Ray-zer), a tracker of missing persons and an expert in emerging religions in the present age of neo-millennialism and conspiracy theory. Raszer's preoccupation, as well as his author's, is in "what draws otherwise rational people to believe in unbelievable things...and act upon them." With his son, Nathanael, he authored a YA novel of speculative science-fiction entitled The Switch, published in 2017 by Curiosity Quills Press. His latest novel is Ministry, described by its author as a "post-apocalyptic romance," and will be published in 2022 by TouchPoint Press.

In 2003, Hill met Dorris Halsey, then 77, who had been literary agent for, among others, Aldous Huxley, Henry Miller, Upton Sinclair, and Ben Hecht. In Halsey and her younger partner and protégé, Kimberley Cameron, Hill found champions for both his fiction and his screenwriting work. Halsey introduced the writer to those in her circle, including Dr. Mani Lal Bhaumik, with whom Hill developed the memoir Code Name God and for whom he edited a primer on cosmology, The Cosmic Detective, and Laura Huxley, with whom he briefly collaborated on a film adaptation of her late husband's novel, The Island. Halsey died in 2006, and Cameron now helms the Reece Halsey Agency. He has also written feature articles for the L.A. Weekly and short fiction for Susie Bright's Best American Erotica 2004 and the Absinthe Literary Review, which awarded him its Eros & Thanatos prize for The Grotto. Hill is represented for motion picture projects by Steve Fisher at APA.

The Stephan Raszer Investigations
Written in a neo-noir style that pays homage equally to Raymond Chandler and William Gibson, the Raszer Investigations are described by their author as "boundary explorations" that track the sometimes precarious path between faith and fraud, and between genuine mystical experience and madness. Using the detective genre as a foil for his metafiction, Hill employs his protagonist, Stephan Raszer, to probe a demimonde that oscillates between journalistic truth and high fantasy. Chandler scholar Judith Freeman, author of The Long Embrace: Raymond Chandler and the Women He Loved, described Raszer in the L.A. Weekly as "the thinking person's private eye" and Nowhere-Land, the third in the series, as "maybe the first truly 21st-century mystery I've read." Scottish crime author and Edgar Award winner Ian Rankin (Inspector Rebus) described Hill's first novel this way: "Dollops of humor and horror and erotica, a good solid conspiracy, and a hero who is a James Bond for the spiritually uncertain 21st century. Written like a thriller-ish Thomas Pynchon or a literary Robert Ludlum."

Hill's first novel, Enoch's Portal, was loosely based on the exploits of the infamous Order of the Solar Temple, a Franco-Swiss "suicide cult" and spiritual Ponzi scheme that claimed the legacy of the Knights Templar and fifty-three lives. Initially published in hardcover in 2001, Portal anticipated the phenomenon of The Da Vinci Code by finding grist for modern myth in the legend of The Priory of Sion. But where Dan Brown makes his revelations explicit, Hill's hero Raszer walks the mean streets of Los Angeles and Old Prague in a dense fog of deliberate, riddling, and for some critics, maddening obscurity. The book was read in manuscript by Caldecott Chubb at Alphaville, then optioned by Paramount Pictures and assigned to cult director Alex Proyas, who developed two scripts before abandoning it to make "I,Robot." Following a dispute with "Portal's" publisher over problems that had arisen from the Paramount deal, Hill was successful in reclaiming his ownership of the copyright.

Five years later, Hill followed with the second installment of the Stephan Raszer series, The Last Days Of Madame Rey, a tarot reading in the form of a mystery novel, or a mystery novel in the form of a tarot reading, with acknowledged literary debts to writers from Jules Verne to H. Rider Haggard to Jorge Borges to Wilhelm Reich. The third installment in the series arrived in June 2009 with Nowhere-Land, a Sufi legend mapped out as a role-playing game on the borderlands of Iraq, Syria, and Turkey in the imagined reality of a metastasizing Mideast war involving an ISIS-like Islamist sect that traces its origins to Hassan-i Sabbah's Cult of the Assassins. Nowhere-Land's panoramic and eerily prophetic cast of characters also involves members of the Yezidi sect and Kurdish peshmerga fighters, as well as the chimerical CIA agent Philby Greenstreet, who provides critical assistance to Raszer's mission.

Published works
 Nowhere-Land (Counterpoint 2009) 
 The Last Days Of Madame Rey (Carroll & Graf 2006) 
 Enoch's Portal (Champion Press 2002) 
 Scoring The Screen: The Secret Language of Film Music (Hal Leonard Publishing, Spring 2017)

Short stories
 China Lake (2009)
 The Org (2009)
 Death and the Plumber (2004)
 The Swami and the Savant (2005)
 The Grotto (2004)
 The Conductor (2003)

Screenplays
 Tesla
 Little Red Book

References

External links 

Scoring The Screen
Author Website
Mention in Variety

1951 births
Living people
21st-century American novelists
American fantasy writers
American film score composers
American male novelists
American music educators
American mystery writers
Columbia College Chicago faculty
Tisch School of the Arts alumni
American male short story writers
Record producers from Illinois
Novelists from Illinois
21st-century American male writers